Luigi "Gino" Valenzano (April 24, 1920, Asti - May 28, 2011) was an Italian racing driver. He entered 39 races between 1947 and 1955 in Abarths, Maseratis and Lancias as a teammate of drivers like Robert Manzon and Froilán González.

Early life
As a young man. Valenzano was fascinated by airplanes and air travel, so he studied at the Academy of Caserta. However, he was called back to Turin after his father's sudden death. 
During World War II Gino and his brother Piero had to leave Turin because of their relation to Pietro Badoglio, so they lived in Rome for a while, until they were sold out to soldiers, who deported the brothers to Mauthausen. May 5, 1945 they were liberated by the Americans.

Racing career

Valenzano started competing in hillclimbs in his own build single seater and received later a BMW-engined single seater designed by Enrico Nardi. 
He was soon noticed by Carlo Abarth, who hired him as works driver for Abarth. There he met Gianni Lancia, son of Vincenzo, with whom he went to the Liceo classico Massimo d'Azeglio as a child. Lancia let him try out an Aurelia B20 and Valenzano decided to compete in professional racing with that car and later the Lancia D20 and D24. He competed in Mille Miglia, Targa Florio and the 24 Hours of Le Mans. Among his teammates were Luigi Segre and other successful drivers, including Alberto Ascari, Luigi Villoresi, Juan Manuel Fangio and Luigi Musso.
In 1955 Lancia withdrew as a team from professional racing, so Valenzano switched to Maserati and drove six more races. However, this would be his last season, because his brother Piero died during the Coppa d' Oro delle Dolomiti on July 10, 1955.

Complete results

References

1920 births
2011 deaths
People from Asti
Italian racing drivers
Mille Miglia drivers
24 Hours of Le Mans drivers
Sportspeople from the Province of Asti